Joseph "Sandy" Saddler (June 23, 1926 – September 18, 2001) was an American professional boxer. He was a two-time featherweight world champion, having also held the super featherweight title.  Over his twelve-year career (1944–56), Saddler scored 104 knockouts and was stopped only once himself, in his second professional fight, by Jock Leslie. In 2003, Saddler was ranked number five on The Ring magazine's list of "100 Greatest Punchers of All Time". His nephew is Grandmaster Flash.

Professional career

Saddler is best known for his four-bout series with Willie Pep.  However, he had 93 fights prior to facing Pep.

Early career 
Saddler turned Pro at Bantamweight winning his pro-debut & losing his second fight, he fought 10 more times at Bantamweight & had a record of 85-6-2 prior to facing Willie Pep, Saddler record included a loss to Phil Terranova & a Draw with Jimmy Carter

Facing Willie Pep 
The two first faced off on October 29, 1948.  Pep was the reigning featherweight champion of the world, and coming into the fight boasted a record of 134-1-1 (43 KO).  Saddler was the underdog & captured the title by knocking Pep down four times en route to a four-round knockout victory. This was only the second time that Pep was beaten, Sammy Angott beat him in 1943, and first time he was ever stopped in 137 bouts.

Pep then recaptured the crown on February 11, 1949, by outpointing Saddler over 15 rounds.  Saddler regained the crown on September 8, 1950 by a TKO in the eight round.  Pep quit after dislocating his shoulder.  The pair fought their last fight on September 26, 1951.  In one of the dirtiest championship fights ever fought, Saddler won when the fight was stopped in the tenth round.

Saddler fought several other notable opponents during his career.  He knocked out future lightweight champion Joe Brown, as well as lightweight champions Lauro Salas and Paddy DeMarco.  Saddler beat lightweight champion Jimmy Carter, knocked out future junior lightweight champion Gabriel "Flash" Elorde, and lost to Larry Boardman.

Professional record 

| style="text-align:center;" colspan="8"|144 Wins (103 knockouts), 16 Losses (1 knockout), 2 Draws
|-  style="text-align:center; background:#e3e3e3;"
|  style="border-style:none none solid solid; "|Res.
|  style="border-style:none none solid solid; "|Record
|  style="border-style:none none solid solid; "|Opponent
|  style="border-style:none none solid solid; "|Type
|  style="border-style:none none solid solid; "|Rd., Time
|  style="border-style:none none solid solid; "|Date
|  style="border-style:none none solid solid; "|Location
|  style="border-style:none none solid solid; "|Notes
|- align=center
|Loss
|145–16–2
|align=left|Larry Boardman
|
|
|
|align=left|
|align=left|
|- align=center
|Win
|145–15–2
|align=left|George Monroe
|
|
|
|align=left|
|align=left|
|- align=center
|Win
|144–15–2
|align=left|Flash Elorde
|
|
|
|align=left|
|align=left|
|- align=center
|Win
|143–15–2
|align=left|Dave Gallardo
|
|
|
|align=left|
|align=left|
|- align=center
|Loss
|142–15–2
|align=left|Flash Elorde
|
|
|
|align=left|
|align=left|
|- align=center
|Win
|142–14–2
|align=left|Shigeji Kaneko
|
|
|
|align=left|
|align=left|
|- align=center
|Loss
|141–14–2
|align=left|Joey Lopes
|
|
|
|align=left|
|align=left|
|- align=center
|Win
|141–13–2
|align=left|Kenny Davis
|
|
|
|align=left|
|align=left|
|- align=center
|Win
|140–13–2
|align=left|Teddy Davis
|
|
|
|align=left|
|align=left|
|- align=center
|Win
|139–13–2
|align=left|Paddy DeMarco
|
|
|
|align=left|
|align=left|
|- align=center
|Win
|138–13–2
|align=left|Lulu Perez
|
|
|
|align=left|
|align=left|
|- align=center
|Win
|137–13–2
|align=left|Bobby Woods
|
|
|
|align=left|
|align=left|
|- align=center
|Win
|136–13–2
|align=left|Ray Famechon
|
|
|
|align=left|
|align=left|
|- align=center
|Win
|135–13–2
|align=left|Baby Ortiz
|
|
|
|align=left|
|align=left|
|- align=center
|Win
|134–13–2
|align=left|Jackie Blair
|
|
|
|align=left|
|align=left|
|- align=center
|Win
|133–13–2
|align=left|Libby Manzo 
|
|
|
|align=left|
|align=left|
|- align=center
|Loss
|132–13–2
|align=left|Hoacine Khalfi 
|
|
|
|align=left|
|align=left|
|- align=center
|Win
|132–12–2
|align=left|Augie Salazar 
|
|
|
|align=left|
|align=left|
|- align=center
|Win
|131–12–2
|align=left|Charlie Slaughter
|
|
|
|align=left|
|align=left|
|- align=center
|Win
|130–12–2
|align=left|Bill Bossio
|
|
|
|align=left|
|align=left|
|- align=center
|Win
|129–12–2
|align=left|Tommy Collins
|
|
|
|align=left|
|align=left|
|- align=center
|Loss
|128–12–2
|align=left|Armand Savoie
|
|
|
|align=left|
|align=left|
|- align=center
|Loss
|128–11–2
|align=left|George Araujo
|
|
|
|align=left|
|align=left|
|- align=center
|Loss
|128–10–2
|align=left|Paddy DeMarco
|
|
|
|align=left|
|align=left|
|- align=center
|Win
|128–9–2
|align=left|Willie Pep
|
|
|
|align=left|
|align=left|
|- align=center
|Loss
|127–9–2
|align=left|Paddy DeMarco
|
|
|
|align=left|
|align=left|
|- align=center
|Win
|127–8–2
|align=left|Hermie Freeman
|
|
|
|align=left|
|align=left|
|- align=center
|Win
|126–8–2
|align=left|Angel Olivieri
|
|
|
|align=left|
|align=left|
|- align=center
|Win
|125–8–2
|align=left|Mario Salinas
|
|
|
|align=left|
|align=left|
|- align=center
|Win
|124–8–2
|align=left|Oscar Flores
|
|
|
|align=left|
|align=left|
|- align=center
|Win
|123–8–2
|align=left|Alfredo Prada
|
|
|
|align=left|
|align=left|
|- align=center
|Win
|122–8–2
|align=left|Harry LaSane
|
|
|
|align=left|
|align=left|
|- align=center
|Win
|121–8–2
|align=left|Freddie Herman
|
|
|
|align=left|
|align=left|
|- align=center
|Win
|120–8–2
|align=left|Lauro Salas
|
|
|
|align=left|
|align=left|
|- align=center
|Win
|119–8–2
|align=left|Diego Sosa
|
|
|
|align=left|
|align=left|
|- align=center
|Win
|118–8–2
|align=left|Jesse Underwood 
|
|
|
|align=left|
|align=left|
|- align=center
|Loss
|117–8–2
|align=left|Del Flanagan 
|
|
|
|align=left|
|align=left|
|- align=center
|Win
|117–7–2
|align=left|Charley Riley 
|
|
|
|align=left|
|align=left|
|- align=center
|Win
|116–7–2
|align=left|Harry LaSane 
|
|
|
|align=left|
|align=left|
|- align=center
|Win
|115–7–2
|align=left|Willie Pep 
|
|
|
|align=left|
|align=left|
|- align=center
|Win
|114–7–2
|align=left|Leroy Willis 
|
|
|
|align=left|
|align=left|
|- align=center
|Win
|113–7–2
|align=left|Johnny Forte 
|
|
|
|align=left|
|align=left|
|- align=center
|Win
|112–7–2
|align=left|Miguel Acevedo 
|
|
|
|align=left|
|align=left|
|- align=center
|Win
|111–7–2
|align=left|Jesse Underwood 
|
|
|
|align=left|
|align=left|
|- align=center
|Win
|110–7–2
|align=left|Lauro Salas
|
|
|
|align=left|
|align=left|
|- align=center
|Win
|109–7–2
|align=left|Reuben Davis 
|
|
|
|align=left|
|align=left|
|- align=center
|Win
|108–7–2
|align=left|Luis Ramos  
|
|
|
|align=left|
|align=left|
|- align=center
|Win
|107–7–2
|align=left|Chuck Burton  
|
|
|
|align=left|
|align=left|
|- align=center
|Win
|106–7–2
|align=left|Pedro Firpo  
|
|
|
|align=left|
|align=left|
|- align=center
|Win
|105–7–2
|align=left|Paulie Jackson  
|
|
|
|align=left|
|align=left|
|- align=center
|Win
|104–7–2
|align=left|Orlando Zulueta  
|
|
|
|align=left|
|align=left|
|- align=center
|Win
|103–7–2
|align=left|Leroy Willis 
|
|
|
|align=left|
|align=left|
|- align=center
|Win
|102–7–2
|align=left|Paddy DeMarco 
|
|
|
|align=left|
|align=left|
|- align=center
|Win
|101–7–2
|align=left|Proctor Heinhold 
|
|
|
|align=left|
|align=left|
|- align=center
|Win
|100–7–2
|align=left|Harold Dade
|
|
|
|align=left|
|align=left|
|- align=center
|Win
|99–7–2
|align=left|Alfredo Escobar
|
|
|
|align=left|
|align=left|
|- align=center
|Win
|98–7–2
|align=left|Johnny Rowe
|
|
|
|align=left|
|align=left|
|- align=center
|Win
|97–7–2
|align=left|Chuck Burton 
|
|
|
|align=left|
|align=left|
|- align=center
|Win
|96–7–2
|align=left|Gordon House 
|
|
|
|align=left|
|align=left|
|- align=center
|Win
|95–7–2
|align=left|Luis Ramos 
|
|
|
|align=left|
|align=left|
|- align=center
|Win
|94–7–2
|align=left|Jim Keery 
|
|
|
|align=left|
|align=left|
|- align=center
|Win
|93–7–2
|align=left|Ermanno Bonetti 
|
|
|
|align=left|
|align=left|
|- align=center
|Win
|92–7–2
|align=left|Felix Ramirez 
|
|
|
|align=left|
|align=left|
|- align=center
|Loss
|91–7–2
|align=left|Willie Pep 
|
|
|
|align=left|
|align=left|
|- align=center
|Win
|91–6–2
|align=left|Young Finnegan 
|
|
|
|align=left|
|align=left|
|- align=center
|Win
|90–6–2
|align=left|Terry Young 
|
|
|
|align=left|
|align=left|
|- align=center
|Win
|89–6–2
|align=left|Eddie Giosa 
|
|
|
|align=left|
|align=left|
|- align=center
|Win
|88–6–2
|align=left|Dennis Pat Brady 
|
|
|
|align=left|
|align=left|
|- align=center
|Win
|87–6–2
|align=left|Tomas Beato
|
|
|
|align=left|
|align=left|
|- align=center
|Win
|86–6–2
|align=left|Willie Pep
|
|
|
|align=left|
|align=left|
|- align=center
|Win
|85–6–2
|align=left|Willie Roache
|
|
|
|align=left|
|align=left|
|- align=center
|Win
|84–6–2
|align=left|Aquilino Allen
|
|
|
|align=left|
|align=left|
|- align=center
|Win
|83–6–2
|align=left|Kid Zefine
|
|
|
|align=left|
|align=left|
|- align=center
|Loss
|82–6–2
|align=left|Chico Rosa
|
|
|
|align=left|
|align=left|
|- align=center
|Win
|82–5–2
|align=left|Harry LaSane
|
|
|
|align=left|
|align=left|
|- align=center
|Win
|81–5–2
|align=left|Young Tanner
|
|
|
|align=left|
|align=left|
|- align=center
|Win
|80–5–2
|align=left|Jose Alberto Diaz
|
|
|
|align=left|
|align=left|
|- align=center
|Win
|79–5–2
|align=left|Luis Monagas
|
|
|
|align=left|
|align=left|
|- align=center
|Win
|78–5–2
|align=left|Bobby Timpson
|
|
|
|align=left|
|align=left|
|- align=center
|Win
|77–5–2
|align=left|Thompson Harmon
|
|
|
|align=left|
|align=left|
|- align=center
|Win
|76–5–2
|align=left|Archie Wilmer
|
|
|
|align=left|
|align=left|
|- align=center
|Win
|75–5–2
|align=left|Joey Angelo 
|
|
|
|align=left|
|align=left|
|- align=center
|Win
|74–5–2
|align=left|Charley Noel 
|
|
|
|align=left|
|align=left|
|- align=center
|Win
|73–5–2
|align=left|Orlando Zulueta 
|
|
|
|align=left|
|align=left|
|- align=center
|Win
|72–5–2
|align=left|Lino Garcia 
|
|
|
|align=left|
|align=left|
|- align=center
|Win
|71–5–2
|align=left|Kid Barquerito 
|
|
|
|align=left|
|align=left|
|- align=center
|Win
|70–5–2
|align=left|Lino Garcia
|
|
|
|align=left|
|align=left|
|- align=center
|Win
|69–5–2
|align=left|Al Pennino 
|
|
|
|align=left|
|align=left|
|- align=center
|Loss
|68–5–2
|align=left|Humberto Sierra 
|
|
|
|align=left|
|align=left|
|- align=center
|Win
|68–4–2
|align=left|Angelo Ambrosano 
|
|
|
|align=left|
|align=left|
|- align=center
|Win
|67–4–2
|align=left|Miguel Acevedo
|
|
|
|align=left|
|align=left|
|- align=center
|Win
|66–4–2
|align=left|Leslie Harris
|
|
|
|align=left|
|align=left|
|- align=center
|Win
|65–4–2
|align=left|Oscar Calles
|
|
|
|align=left|
|align=left|
|- align=center
|style="background:#abcdef;"|Draw
|64–4–2
|align=left|Jimmy Carter
|
|
|
|align=left|
|align=left|
|- align=center
|Win
|64–4–1
|align=left|Melvin Bartholomew
|
|
|
|align=left|
|align=left|
|- align=center
|Win
|63–4–1
|align=left|Joe Brown
|
|
|
|align=left|
|align=left|
|- align=center
|Win
|62–4–1
|align=left|Charley Cabey Lewis
|
|
|
|align=left|
|align=left|
|- align=center
|Win
|61–4–1
|align=left|Carlos Malacara
|
|
|
|align=left|
|align=left|
|- align=center
|Win
|60–4–1
|align=left|Leonardo Lopez
|
|
|
|align=left|
|align=left|
|- align=center
|Win
|59–4–1
|align=left|Larry Thomas
|
|
|
|align=left|
|align=left|
|- align=center
|Win
|58–4–1
|align=left|Humberto Zavala
|
|
|
|align=left|
|align=left|
|- align=center
|Win
|57–4–1
|align=left|George 'Dusty' Brown
|
|
|
|align=left|
|align=left|
|- align=center
|Win
|56–4–1
|align=left|Leonard Caesar 
|
|
|
|align=left|
|align=left|
|- align=center
|Win
|55–4–1
|align=left|Luis Marquez 
|
|
|
|align=left|
|align=left|
|- align=center
|Win
|54–4–1
|align=left|Clyde English 
|
|
|
|align=left|
|align=left|
|- align=center
|Win
|53–4–1
|align=left|Artie Price 
|
|
|
|align=left|
|align=left|
|- align=center
|Win
|52–4–1
|align=left|Joe Rodriguez 
|
|
|
|align=left|
|align=left|
|- align=center
|Win
|51–4–1
|align=left|Pedro Firpo 
|
|
|
|align=left|
|align=left|
|- align=center
|Win
|50–4–1
|align=left|Dom Amoroso 
|
|
|
|align=left|
|align=left|
|- align=center
|Loss
|49–4–1
|align=left|Phil Terranova
|
|
|
|align=left|
|align=left|
|- align=center
|Win
|49–3–1
|align=left|Georgie Cooper
|
|
|
|align=left|
|align=left|
|- align=center
|Win
|48–3–1
|align=left|Cedric Flournoy
|
|
|
|align=left|
|align=left|
|- align=center
|Win
|47–3–1
|align=left|Pedro Firpo
|
|
|
|align=left|
|align=left|
|- align=center
|Win
|46–3–1
|align=left|Johnny Wolgast
|
|
|
|align=left|
|align=left|
|- align=center
|Win
|45–3–1
|align=left|Ralph LaSalle
|
|
|
|align=left|
|align=left|
|- align=center
|Loss
|44–3–1
|align=left|Bobby McQuillar
|
|
|
|align=left|
|align=left|
|- align=center
|Win
|44–2–1
|align=left|Arbie Bowie
|
|
|
|align=left|
|align=left|
|- align=center
|Win
|43–2–1
|align=left|Filiberto Osario
|
|
|
|align=left|
|align=left|
|- align=center
|Win
|42–2–1
|align=left|Joey Monteiro
|
|
|
|align=left|
|align=left|
|- align=center
|Win
|41–2–1
|align=left|Benny Daniels
|
|
|
|align=left|
|align=left|
|- align=center
|Win
|40–2–1
|align=left|Richie Miyashiro
|
|
|
|align=left|
|align=left|
|- align=center
|Win
|39–2–1
|align=left|Earl Mintz
|
|
|
|align=left|
|align=left|
|- align=center
|Win
|38–2–1
|align=left|Bobby English
|
|
|
|align=left|
|align=left|
|- align=center
|Win
|37–2–1
|align=left|Lou Langley
|
|
|
|align=left|
|align=left|
|- align=center
|Win
|36–2–1
|align=left|Luis Rivera
|
|
|
|align=left|
|align=left|
|- align=center
|Win
|35–2–1
|align=left|Joey Monteiro
|
|
|
|align=left|
|align=left|
|- align=center
|Win
|34–2–1
|align=left|Herbie (Biff) Jones
|
|
|
|align=left|
|align=left|
|- align=center
|Win
|33–2–1
|align=left|Leo Methot
|
|
|
|align=left|
|align=left|
|- align=center
|Win
|32–2–1
|align=left|Bobby Washington
|
|
|
|align=left|
|align=left|
|- align=center
|Win
|31–2–1
|align=left|Caswell Harris
|
|
|
|align=left|
|align=left|
|- align=center
|Win
|30–2–1
|align=left|Chilindrina Valencia
|
|
|
|align=left|
|align=left|
|- align=center
|Win
|29–2–1
|align=left|Willie Anderson
|
|
|
|align=left|
|align=left|
|- align=center
|Win
|28–2–1
|align=left|Jimmy Allen
|
|
|
|align=left|
|align=left|
|- align=center
|Win
|27–2–1
|align=left|Georgie Knox
|
|
|
|align=left|
|align=left|
|- align=center
|Win
|26–2–1
|align=left|Joey Monteiro
|
|
|
|align=left|
|align=left|
|- align=center
|Win
|25–2–1
|align=left|Harold Gibson
|
|
|
|align=left|
|align=left|
|- align=center
|Win
|24–2–1
|align=left|Joey Gatto
|
|
|
|align=left|
|align=left|
|- align=center
|Win
|23–2–1
|align=left|Benny May
|
|
|
|align=left|
|align=left|
|- align=center
|Win
|22–2–1
|align=left|Joey Puig
|
|
|
|align=left|
|align=left|
|- align=center
|Win
|21–2–1
|align=left|Lucky Johnson
|
|
|
|align=left|
|align=left|
|- align=center
|Win
|20–2–1
|align=left|Tony Oshiro
|
|
|
|align=left|
|align=left|
|- align=center
|Win
|19–2–1
|align=left|Midget Mayo
|
|
|
|align=left|
|align=left|
|- align=center
|Win
|18–2–1
|align=left|Earl Mintz
|
|
|
|align=left|
|align=left|
|- align=center
|Win
|17–2–1
|align=left|Tony Oshiro
|
|
|
|align=left|
|align=left|
|- align=center
|Win
|16–2–1
|align=left|Percy Cabey Lewis
|
|
|
|align=left|
|align=left|
|- align=center
|Win
|15–2–1
|align=left|Manuel Torres
|
|
|
|align=left|
|align=left|
|- align=center
|Win
|14–2–1
|align=left|Ken Tompkins
|
|
|
|align=left|
|align=left|
|- align=center
|Win
|13–2–1
|align=left|Manuel Torres
|
|
|
|align=left|
|align=left|
|- align=center
|Win
|12–2–1
|align=left|Cliff Smith
|
|
|
|align=left|
|align=left|
|- align=center
|Win
|11–2–1
|align=left|Georgie Knox
|
|
|
|align=left|
|align=left|
|- align=center
|Win
|10–2–1
|align=left|Al Pennino
|
|
|
|align=left|
|align=left|
|- align=center
|Win
|9–2–1
|align=left|Benny Saladino
|
|
|
|align=left|
|align=left|
|- align=center
|Win
|8–2–1
|align=left|Clyde English
|
|
|
|align=left|
|align=left|
|- align=center
|style="background:#abcdef;"|Draw
|7–2–1
|align=left|Lou Alter
|
|
|
|align=left|
|align=left|
|- align=center
|Loss
|7–2
|align=left|Lou Alter
|
|
|
|align=left|
|align=left|
|- align=center
|Win
|7–1
|align=left|Jose Aporte Torres
|
|
|
|align=left|
|align=left|
|- align=center
|Win
|6–1
|align=left|Domingo Diaz
|
|
|
|align=left|
|align=left|
|- align=center
|Win
|5–1
|align=left|Jose Aporte Torres
|
|
|
|align=left|
|align=left|
|- align=center
|Win
|4–1
|align=left|Jose Aporte Torres
|
|
|
|align=left|
|align=left|
|- align=center
|Win
|3–1
|align=left|Joe Landry
|
|
|
|align=left|
|align=left|
|- align=center
|Win
|2–1
|align=left|Al King
|
|
|
|align=left|
|align=left|
|- align=center
|Loss
|1–1
|align=left|Jock Leslie
|
|
|
|align=left|
|align=left|
|- align=center
|Win
|1–0
|align=left|Earl Roys
|
|
|
|align=left|
|

After boxing

Saddler retired from boxing in 1956, aged 30, after an eye injury sustained in a traffic accident.  He later became a trainer and helped train the young George Foreman in the 1970s, including Foreman's first Heavyweight Championship of the World reign. In 2003, he was ranked #5 on the Ring Magazine's list of 100 greatest punchers of all time.

In 1990, Saddler was inducted into the prestigious International Boxing Hall of Fame.
He is the Uncle of Joseph Saddler, better known as Grandmaster Flash.
Saddler died on September 18, 2001.

See also
List of featherweight boxing champions
List of super featherweight boxing champions

References

External links
 
https://boxrec.com/media/index.php/National_Boxing_Association%27s_Quarterly_Ratings:_1948
https://boxrec.com/media/index.php/National_Boxing_Association%27s_Quarterly_Ratings:_1949
https://boxrec.com/media/index.php/National_Boxing_Association%27s_Quarterly_Ratings:_1950
https://boxrec.com/media/index.php/National_Boxing_Association%27s_Quarterly_Ratings:_1951
https://boxrec.com/media/index.php/National_Boxing_Association%27s_Quarterly_Ratings:_1955
Sandy Saddler - CBZ Profile

|-

|-

|-

1926 births
2001 deaths
Boxers from Boston
International Boxing Hall of Fame inductees
Featherweight boxers
World boxing champions
World featherweight boxing champions
Super-featherweight boxers
American male boxers